"Get Dumb" is a 2007 single by Swedish DJs Axwell, Steve Angello and Sebastian Ingrosso, (the three later known as Swedish House Mafia) along with Dutch DJ Laidback Luke. It was the first of two songs to feature all four artists, followed by "Leave the World Behind" in 2009. The song was also the first ever collaboration by the Swedish trio before their formation as a supergroup. The song charted in the Netherlands, peaking at #45.

Track listing

Credits
 Produced at Groove Motel, Stockholm
 Vocals – Sebastian Ingrosso
 Drums – Axwell
 Keyboards – Steve Angello
 Percussion – Laidback Luke
 Label: Big & Dirty

Charts

References

External links 
 

2007 songs
2007 singles
Songs written by Axwell
Songs written by Steve Angello
Songs written by Sebastian Ingrosso
Data Records singles
Steve Angello songs
Axwell songs
Sebastian Ingrosso songs
Laidback Luke songs
Song recordings produced by Sebastian Ingrosso
Song recordings produced by Steve Angello